Jazzablanca is an international jazz festival held yearly in Casablanca, Morocco. Thousands of festival-goers gather at 4 stages over 9 days.

Description 
At the hippodrome, there are concerts held at 3 different stages over 6 days. For these concerts, an admission fee is charged.

There are also concerts held at United Nations Square over 3 days. Admission is free for these concerts.

Some artists who've performed at Jazzablanca 
 Al Jarreau
 Dianne Reeves
 Billy Paul
 Gloria Gaynor
 Pat Martino
 Jason Mraz
 Esperanza Spalding
 Marcus Miller
 LP
 Patti Smith
 Franz Ferdinand
Meryem Aboulouafa

References 

Casablanca